Good clinical practice (GCP) is an international quality standard, which governments can then transpose into regulations for clinical trials involving human subjects. GCP follows the International Council for Harmonisation of Technical Requirements for Pharmaceuticals for Human Use (ICH), and enforces tight guidelines on ethical aspects of clinical research. 

High standards are required in terms of comprehensive documentation for the clinical protocol, record keeping, training, and facilities, including computers and software. Quality assurance and inspections ensure that these standards are achieved. GCP aims to ensure that the studies are scientifically authentic and that the clinical properties of the investigational product are properly documented.

GCP guidelines include protection of human rights for the subjects and volunteers in a clinical trial. It also provides assurance of the safety and efficacy of the newly developed compounds. GCP guidelines include standards on how clinical trials should be conducted, define the roles and responsibilities of institutional review boards, clinical research investigators, clinical trial sponsors, and monitors. In the pharmaceutical industry monitors are often called clinical research associates.

A series of unsuccessful and ineffective clinical trials in the past were the main reason for the creation of ICH and GCP guidelines in the US and Europe. These discussions ultimately led to the development of certain regulations and guidelines, which evolved into the code of practice for international consistency of quality research.

Legal and regulatory status

 European Union: In the EU, Good Clinical Practice (Directive 2001/20/EC) is backed and regulated by formal legislation contained in the Clinical Trial Directive (Officially Directive 2001/20/EC). A similar guideline for clinical trials of medical devices is the international standard ISO 14155, which is valid in the European Union as a harmonized standard. These standards for clinical trials are sometimes referred to as ICH-GCP or ISO-GCP to differentiate between the two and the lowest grade of recommendation in clinical guidelines.
 United States: Although ICH GCP guidelines are recommended by the Food and Drug Administration (FDA), they are not statutory in the United States. The National Institutes of Health requires NIH-funded clinical investigators and clinical trial staff who are involved in the design, conduct, oversight, or management of clinical trials to be trained in Good Clinical Practice.

ICH GCP overview

 Glossary
Principles of ICH GCP
Guidelines for:
institutional review board (IRB) / independent ethics committee (IEC)
investigator
 trial sponsor (industrial, academic)
clinical trial protocol and protocol amendments
investigator's brochure
essential documents

Criticism
GCP has been called 'a less morally authoritative document' than the Declaration of Helsinki, lacking moral principles and guidance in the following areas:
 Disclosure of conflict of interest
 Public disclosure of study design
 Benefit for populations in which research is conducted
 Reporting of accurate results and publication of negative findings
 Access to treatment after research has been conducted
 Restriction of use of placebo in control group where effective alternative treatment is available

In the book Bad Pharma, Ben Goldacre mentions these criticisms and notes that the GCP rules "aren't terrible... [they are] more focused on procedures, while Helsinki clearly articulates moral principles".

See also

 Data monitoring committees
 Directive 2001/20/EC (European Union)
 Drug development
 EudraVigilance
 European Forum for Good Clinical Practice (EFGCP)
 European Medicines Agency (EMEA)
 GxP
 Human experimentation in the United States
 Institutional review board
 Inverse benefit law
 Medical ethics
 Pharmacovigilance
 Pharmaceutical company

References

External links
 ICH Topic E 6 (R2)
 Good Clinical Practice (from U.S. Food and Drug Administration)
 Some Relevant UK Statutory Instruments 
 The Medicines for Human Use (Clinical Trials) Regulations 2004
 The Medicines for Human Use (Clinical Trials) Amendment Regulations 2006
 The Medicines for Human Use (Clinical Trials) Amendment (No.2) Regulations 2006

 
Clinical research
Pharmaceutical industry
Good practice